Auguste Island is a flat-topped island less than  long, lying  northeast of Two Hummock Island in Gerlache Strait. It was discovered by the Belgian Antarctic Expedition (1897–99) under Lieutenant Adrien de Gerlache, and named by him for his father.

See also 
 List of Antarctic and sub-Antarctic islands

References

 

Islands of Graham Land
Danco Coast